A presentation copy is a copy of a book that has been dedicated, illustrated, or signed (without request) by the author, or a book that was a gift from the author.  An inscribed copy, by contrast, is one signed by the author at the book owner's request. Presentation copies are generally more valuable and rarer than inscribed copies.

Examples of presentation copies
 Plays, Never Before Printed (1668), signed by Margaret Cavendish at the Folger Shakespeare Library
 An Account of the Abipones (1784), presentation copy from John Carter Brown to John R. Bartlett at the John Hay Library, Brown University
 A Study in Scarlet (1887), signed "With the Author's Compliments" by Arthur Conan Doyle at the Beinecke Library, Yale University
 The Nursery "Alice" (1889), dedicated by Lewis Carroll, sold by Sotheby's in 2012 for £36,050

References

Book publishing